Esamirim is a genus of longhorn beetles of the subfamily Lamiinae, containing the following species:

 Esamirim carinatus Martins & Galileo, 2004
 Esamirim chionides (Bates, 1885)
 Esamirim divisus Martins & Galileo, 2004
 Esamirim fasciatus Martins & Galileo, 2004

References

Hemilophini